Emma (stylized as EMMA) is a VH1 music video program hosted by Emma Bunton.

Background
After Geri Halliwell's departure, the Spice Girls had a hiatus in 1999. The other members started their solo careers in music, but Bunton devoted to other projects and signed with VH1 to present her own show, becoming VJ. The show was announced in 12 August and aired originally in October 8, with five weekly episodes. A premiere party was held on 28 September. The program follows a similar format to that of 120 Minutes, which aired on MTV. Bunton introduced her favorite music videos and read fans' e-mail. With 60 minutes, the show was aired on Fridays 6 pm. After the original screening VH1 wanted to sign a long-term program with Bunton, but she declined, focusing on her group's new album.

Episodes

References

External links
 
 VH1

1999 British television series debuts
1990s British music television series
1999 British television series endings
English-language television shows
Pop music television series
VH1 music shows
VH1 original programming